Lloyd Joshua Macklin (born 2 August 1991) is an English former footballer who played in the Football League with Swindon Town and Torquay United.

Career
Macklin went on a pre-season tour of Austria with Swindon Town in the summer of 2007 when he was only 15 years old. He came through the ranks at Swindon and made a senior appearance in the home pre-season friendly with Bristol City. He then became the youngest ever player to represent Swindon at first team level, when he came on as a substitute against Brentford in the Football League Trophy in September 2007. He went on to feature for the youth and reserve teams as the 2007-08 campaign was played out, and continued working his way up through 2008–09. He made a couple of first team appearances towards the end of 2008–09.

On 19 February 2010, he joined Torquay United on loan for a month before joining on a permanent basis on 30 June 2010 as a free agent, following Swindon Town's failure to offer him a new contract. In October 2010, Macklin signed a contract extension that kept him at Plainmoor for a further two-years, until 2013. Macklin scored his first senior hat-trick for Torquay and in professional football against Cheltenham Town in the Football League Trophy on 30 August 2011, in a 4–3 defeat. At the end of the 2012–13 season, Macklin was one of seven players who did not feature in manager Alan Knill's plans and as a result was released.

Macklin signed for Farnborough in October 2013, before joining Chippenham Town in December. He was released by the Bluebirds a month later, after missing training.

After a successful 2014-2015 pre-season with Basingstoke Town, Macklin signed for them ready for the start of the new campaign. After two seasons at the Camrose, he joined Hayes & Yeading in May 2016 before signing for Metropolitan Police in October 2016, scoring on his debut against Grays Athletic.

Macklin signed for Welling United just after the start of the 2017–2018 season, but returned to Metropolitan Police in October 2017 after making just five appearances.

Macklin signed for Brighton-based National League South side Whitehawk in March 2018
 but announced his retirement at the end of the 2017–18 season.

Career statistics

References

External links

http://www.swindon.vitalfootball.co.uk/article.asp?a=140867
http://www.thisisplymouth.co.uk/regionalnews/text/Macklin-joins-Buckle-s-young-guns/article-2380275-detail/article.html

1991 births
Living people
English footballers
Swindon Town F.C. players
Torquay United F.C. players
Salisbury City F.C. players
Farnborough F.C. players
Basingstoke Town F.C. players
Whitehawk F.C. players
English Football League players
Association football forwards